Die Engel des Herrn (styled as "DIE (b)ENGEL DES HERRN") is a 1992 studio album by the band Die Engel des Herrn. It was originally released in a limited edition of 1000 on the private label L.S.D., which Klaus Dinger created when he failed to find a record label willing to release the album. When Dinger signed to Captain Trip Records in 1995 all copies of the album not yet sold were bought up and sold by CTR, although no more copies of the album were ever pressed. Consequently only 1000 copies of the album exist, and it is one of the rarest Klaus Dinger albums.

Background and recording

Following the recording of Néondian in 1984, Dinger was enormously in debt. He attempted to reform Neu! with Michael Rother in 1985, but the reunion faltered and the new album (eventually released as Neu! 4) was shelved in early 1986. Dinger then began recording demos for a second solo album along the lines of Néondian, but was dropped from Virgin Records before the album could be professionally finished (it was eventually released as Blue in 1999). Dinger, severely disillusioned with the music industry, opted to form a new band using younger musicians.

The as yet unnamed band performed at a concert in Düsseldorf, and then began recording an album at Dinger's studios near Kamperland, Netherlands. They adopted the name "Die Engel des Herrn" or "The Angels of the Lord". The band name is sometimes written as "Die (b)Engel des Herrn", which translates as "The Rascals of the Lord". Dinger was joined by lead guitarist and violinist Gerhard Michel and drummer Klaus Immig.

The album's music is deliberately light and pop-ish, demonstrating Dinger's desire that the band be signed to a major label. There is a prominent use of the mellotron as well as sound recordings throughout the album.

After recording was completed in 1989 Dinger began looking for a label which would release the album, but was rejected. In 1990 Dinger's father Heinz died, and Klaus Immig's young son drowned in a lake. By the end of 1991 Dinger had decided to release the album himself privately, and he did this the following year on the L.S.D. label. This was to be the only L.S.D. release, available by mail order on both LP and CD, limited to 1000 copies. The CD version came with a 20-minute bonus jam, whilst the LP was packaged with a large D.E.D.H. poster. When Dinger signed to Captain Trip Records in 1995, his new label bought up the remaining copies of the album and marketed them in Japan with a new inlay and catalogue number.

Track listing
All tracks written by Klaus Dinger except where indicated.

 "Die Engel des Herrn" - 7:40
 "Sunlight" - 3:54
 "Little Angel" - 2:31
 "S.O.S." - 1:47 (Klaus Dinger, Gerhard Michel)
 "Bitte, Bitte!" - 2:10 (Dinger, Michel)
 "Tschüus" - 6:46
 "Cha Cha 2000" - 10:36
 "Cha Cha 3000" - 3:09
 "Die Bengel des Herrn" - 20:26 (Dinger, Klaus Immig, Michel) CD only bonus track

Personnel

 Klaus Dinger - guitar, percussion, production, tambourine, vocals
 Klaus Immig - drums, percussion
 Gerhard Michel - bass, guitar, Jew's harp, percussion, tambourine, tubular bells, violin, vocals
 Niklaus van Rhejin - accordion, harmonium, keyboards, piano

References

1992 albums
Klaus Dinger albums